The 1997–98 Combined Counties Football League season was the 20th in the history of the Combined Counties Football League, a football competition in England.

League table

The league featured 19 clubs from the previous season, along with one new club:
Chessington & Hook United, joined from the Surrey County Premier League

External links
 Combined Counties League Official Site

1997-98
1997–98 in English football leagues